The Miss Guatemala 2008 pageant was held on March 7, 2008 at Auditorio Nacionalin in Guatemala City, Guatemala. This year only 7 candidates were competing for the national crown. The chosen winner represented Guatemala at the Miss Universe 2008 and at Miss Continente Americano 2008. The winner of best national costume, the costume will be use in Miss Universe 2008. Miss World Guatemala represented Guatemala at the Miss World 2008. Miss Guatemala Internacional represented Guatemala at Miss International 2008.

Final results

Special awards
 Miss Photogenic – Casetie Dubois  (Alta Verapaz)
 Miss Congeniality (voted by the candidates) – Jessica Donabó  (Izabal)
 Best National Costume – Rita Meda  (Ciudad Capital)

Official delegates

External links
Official Website

Miss Guatemala
2008 beauty pageants